Coleophora cornivorella is a moth of the family Coleophoridae. It is found in Canada, including Ontario.

The larvae feed on the leaves of Cornus species. They create a composite leaf case.

References

cornivorella
Moths described in 1945
Moths of North America